European integration is the process of industrial, economic, political, legal, social, and cultural integration of states wholly or partially in Europe or nearby. European integration has primarily come about through the European Union and its policies.

History
In antiquity, the Roman Empire brought about integration of multiple European and Mediterranean territories. The numerous subsequent claims of succession of the Roman Empire, even the iterations of the Classical Empire and its ancient peoples, have occasionally been reinterpreted in the light of post-1950 European integration as providing inspiration and historical precedents. Of those in importance would have to include the Holy Roman Empire, the Hanseatic League, the Peace of Westphalia, the Napoleonic Empire, and the Unification of Germany, Italy, and The Balkans as well as the Latin Monetary Union.

Following the catastrophe of the First World War, thinkers and visionaries from a range of political traditions again began to float the idea of a politically unified Europe. In the early 1920s a range of internationals were founded (or re-founded) to help like-minded political parties to coordinate their activities. These ranged from the Comintern (1919), to the Labour and Socialist International (1921) to the Radical and Democratic Entente of centre-left progressive parties (1924), to the Green International of farmers' parties (1923), to the centre-right International Secretariat of Democratic Parties Inspired by Christianity (1925). While the remit of these internationals was global, the predominance of political parties from Europe meant that they facilitated interaction between the adherents of a given ideology, across European borders. Within each political tradition, voices emerged advocating not merely the cooperation of various national parties, but the pursuit of political institutions at the European level.

One of the first to articulate this view was Richard von Coudenhove-Kalergi, who outlined a conservative vision of European unity in his Pan-Europa manifesto (1923). The First Paneuropean Congress took place in Vienna in 1926, and the association possessed  8000 members by the time of the Wall Street Crash. The aim was for a specifically Christian, and by implication Catholic, Europe. The British civil servant and future Conservative minister Arthur Salter published a book advocating The United States of Europe in 1933.

In contrast the Soviet commissar (minister) Leon Trotsky raised the slogan "For a Soviet United States of Europe" in 1923, advocating a Europe united along communist principles.

Among liberal-democratic parties, the French centre-left undertook several initiatives to group like-minded parties from the European states. In 1927, the French mathematician and politician Émile Borel, a leader of the centre-left Radical Party and the founder of the Radical International, set up a French Committee for European Cooperation, and a further twenty countries set up equivalent committees. However, it remained an elite venture: the largest committee, the French one, possessed fewer than six-hundred members, two-thirds of whom were parliamentarians. Two centre-left French prime ministers went further.  In  1929 Aristide Briand gave a speech in the presence of the League of Nations Assembly in which he proposed the idea of a federation of European nations based on solidarity and in the pursuit of economic prosperity and political and social co-operation. In 1930, at the League's request, Briand presented a Memorandum on the organisation of a system of European Federal Union.  The next year the future French prime minister Édouard Herriot published his book The United States of Europe. Indeed, a template for such a system already existed, in the form of the 1921 Belgian and Luxembourgish  customs and monetary union.

Support for the proposals by the French centre-left came from a range of prestigious figures. Many eminent economists, aware that the economic race-to-the-bottom between states was creating ever greater instability, supported the view: these included John Maynard Keynes. The French political scientist and economist Bertrand Jouvenel remembered a widespread mood after 1924 calling for a "harmonisation of national interests along the lines of European union, for the purpose of common prosperity". The Spanish philosopher and politician, Ortega y Gasset, expressed a position shared by many within Republican Spain: "European unity is no fantasy, but reality itself; and the fantasy is precisely the opposite: the belief that France, Germany, Italy or Spain are substantive & independent realities." Eleftherios Venizelos, Prime Minister of Greece, outlined his government's support in a 1929 speech by saying that "the United States of Europe will represent, even without Russia, a power strong enough to advance, up to a satisfactory point, the prosperity of the other continents as well".

Between the two world wars, the Polish statesman Józef Piłsudski envisaged the idea of a European federation that he called Międzymorze ("Intersea" or "Between-seas"), known in English as Intermarum, which was a Polish-oriented version of Mitteleuropa.

The Great Depression, the rise of fascism and communism and subsequently World War II prevented the inter war movements from gaining further support: between 1933 and 1936 most of Europe's remaining democracies became dictatorships, and even Ortega's Spain and Venizelos's Greece had both been plunged into civil war. But although the supporters of European unity, whether social-democratic, liberal or Christian-democratic, were out of power during the 1930s and unable to put their ideas into practice, many would find themselves in power in the 1940s and 1950s, and better-placed to put into effect their earlier remedies against economic and political crisis.

At the end of World War II, the continental political climate favoured unity in democratic European countries, seen by many as an escape from the extreme forms of nationalism which had devastated the continent. In a speech delivered on 19 September 1946 at the University of Zürich in Switzerland, Winston Churchill postulated a United States of Europe. The same speech however contains remarks, less often quoted, which make it clear that Churchill did not initially see Britain as being part of this United States of Europe:

Theories of integration
European integration scholars Thomas Diez and Antje Wiener identify the general tendencies in the development of European integration theory and suggest to divide theories of integration into three broad phases, which are preceded by a normative proto-integration theory period. There's a gradual shift from theories studying European integration as sui generis towards new approaches that incorporate theories of International Relations and Comparative politics.

Proto-integration period 
The question of how to avoid wars between the nation-states was essential for the first theories. Federalism and functionalism proposed the containment of the nation-state, while transactionalism sought to theorise the conditions for the stabilisation of the nation-state system. Early federalism was more like a political movement calling for European federation by various political actors, for example, Altiero Spinelli calling for a federal Europe in his Ventotene Manifesto, and Paul Valéry envisioning European civilization for unity. State sovereignty was an issue for federalists who hoped political organizations at higher regional level would solve the issue. Representative scholar of functionalism is David Mitrany, who also sees states and their sovereignty as core problem that one should restrain states to prevent future wars. However, Mitrany disagreed with regional integration as he viewed it as mere replication of state-model. Transactionalism, on the other hand, sees increased cross-border exchanges as promoting regional integration so that the risk of war is reduced.

First phase: explaining integration, 1960s onwards 
European integration theory initially focused on explaining integration process of supranational institution-building. One of the most influential theories of European integration is neofunctionalism, influenced by functionalist ideas, developed by Ernst B. Haas (1958) and further investigated by Leon Lindberg (1963). This theory focuses on spillovers of integration, where well-integrated and interdependent areas led to more integration. Neofunctionalism well captures the spillover from the European Coal and Steel Community to the European Economic Community established in the 1957 Treaties of Rome. Transfers of loyalties from the national level to the supranational level is expected to occur as integration progresses.

The other big influential theory in Integration Studies is Intergovernmentalism, advanced by Stanley Hoffmann after the Empty Chair Crisis by French President Charles De Gaulle in the 1960s. Intergovernmentalism and later, Liberal Intergovernmentalism, developed in the 1980s by Andrew Moravcsik focus on governmental actors' impacts that are enhanced by supranational institutions but not restrained from them. The important debate between neofunctionalism and (liberal) intergovernmentalism still remains central in understanding the development and setbacks of the European integration.

Second phase: analyzing governance, 1980s onwards 
As the empirical world has changed, so have the theories and thus the understanding of European Integration. The second generation of integration theorists focused on the importance of institutions and their impacts on both integration process and European governance development. The second phase brought in perspectives from comparative politics in addition to traditional International Relations theoretical references. Studies attempted to understand what kind of polity the EU is and how it operates. For example, new theory multi-level governance (MLG) was developed to understand the workings and development of the EU.

Third phase: constructing the EU, 1990s onwards 
The third phase of integration theory marked a return of International Relations theory with the rise of critical and constructivist approaches in the 1990s. Perspectives from social constructivists, post-structuralists, critical theories, feminist theories are incorporated in integration theories to conceptualize European integration process of widening and deepening.

Citizens' organisations calling for further integration
Various federalist organisations have been created over time supporting the idea of a federal Europe. These include the Union of European Federalists, the European Movement International, the European Federalist Party, and Volt Europa. The Union of European Federalists (UEF) is a European non-governmental organisation, campaigning for a Federal Europe. It consists of 20 constituent organisations and it has been active at the European, national and local levels for more than 50 years. The European Movement International is a lobbying association that coordinates the efforts of associations and national councils with the goal of promoting European integration, and disseminating information about it. The European Federalist Party is a pro-European, pan-European and federalist political party which advocates further integration of the EU and the establishment of a Federal Europe. Its aim is to gather all Europeans to promote European federalism and to participate in all elections all over Europe.  It has national sections in 15 countries. Volt Europa is a pan-European and European federalist political movement that also serves as the pan-European structure for subsidiary parties in EU member states. It is present in 29 countries and participates in elections all over the EU on the local, national and European level.

Overlap of membership in various agreements

There are various agreements with overlapping membership. Several countries take part in a larger number of agreements than others.

Common membership of member states of the European Union
All member states of the European Union (EU) are members of the:
 Organization for Security and Co-operation in Europe (OSCE), Secretariat: Vienna, Austria
 Council of Europe (CoE), HQ: Strasbourg, France
 European Civil Aviation Conference (ECAC), HQ: Neuilly-sur-Seine/Paris, France
 European Organisation for the Safety of Air Navigation (Eurocontrol), HQ: Brussels, Belgium
 European Committee for Standardization (CEN), HQ: Brussels, Belgium
 European Telecommunications Standards Institute (ETSI), HQ: Sophia Antipolis, France
 European Committee for Electrotechnical Standardization (CENELEC), HQ: Brussels, Belgium
 European Union Customs Union (EUCU)
 European Olympic Committees (EOC), HQ: Rome, Italy
 European Patent Convention (EPC)/European Patent Organisation (EPOrg)
 European Atomic Energy Community (EAEC, Euratom)
 Single Euro Payments Area (SEPA)
 European Common Aviation Area (ECAA)
 European Higher Education Area (EHEA) – Belgium as Flemish Community and French Community, i.e. the German-speaking Community of Belgium is not included.
have organizations that are members of the:
 European Broadcasting Union (EBU), HQ: Geneva, Switzerland
 Union of European Football Associations (UEFA), HQ: Nyon, Switzerland
 European Network of Transmission System Operators for Electricity, HQ: Brussels, Belgium
have organisations that are members, associated partners or observers of the
 European Network of Transmission System Operators for Gas, HQ: Brussels, Belgium
are located in the European Broadcasting Area (EBA)

Most integrated countries
21 states are part of the Eurozone or in ERM II without Euro opt-out.

These are Austria, Belgium, Bulgaria, Croatia, Cyprus, Estonia, Finland, France, Germany, Greece, Italy, Ireland, Latvia, Lithuania, Luxembourg, Malta, the Netherlands, Portugal, Slovakia, Slovenia and Spain.

They are all members of or take part in:
 the European Union
 the European Defence Agency (EDA)

Geographic scope

Beyond geographic Europe
Some agreements that are mostly related to countries of the European continent, are also valid in territories outside the continent.

Not listed below are agreements if their scope is beyond geographic Europe only because the agreement includes:
 Territories of transcontinental countries: Russia, Kazakhstan, Turkey, Azerbaijan, Armenia and Georgia contain some territory in Europe and some in Asia
 The EU uses bilateral Enhanced Partnership and Cooperation Agreements as an integration tool.
 Special territories of European countries, e.g. Special territories of member states of the European Union
 Cyprus, which is a member of the Council of Europe and several other agreements

List:
 NATO contains USA and Canada, but has a European focus, Article 10 of the North Atlantic Treaty describes how non-member states may join: "The Parties may [...] invite any other European State in a position to further the principles of this Treaty"
 Organization for Security and Co-operation in Europe (OSCE) contains the United States, Canada, Kyrgyzstan, Tajikistan, Turkmenistan, Uzbekistan, and Mongolia
 European Broadcasting Union (EBU) contains North African and Middle East countries
 European Olympic Committees (EOC) contains Israel

Limited to regions within geographic Europe
Several regional integration efforts have effectively promoted intergovernmental cooperation and reduced the possibility of regional armed conflict. Other initiatives have removed barriers to free trade in European regions, and increased the free movement of people, labour, goods, and capital across national borders.

Nordic countries
Since the end of the Second World War, the following organisations have been established in the Nordic region:

The Nordic Council and the Nordic Council of Ministers is a co-operation forum for the parliaments and governments of the Nordic countries created in February 1953. It includes the states of Denmark, Finland, Iceland, Norway and Sweden, and their autonomous territories (Greenland, Faroe Islands and Åland).

The Nordic Passport Union, created in 1954 but implemented on 1 May 1958, establishes free movement across borders without passports for the countries' citizens. It comprises Denmark, Sweden and Norway as foundational states; further, it includes Finland and Iceland since 24 September 1965, and the Danish autonomous territories of Faroe Islands since 1 January 1966.

Baltic Sea region
The following political and/or economic organisations have been in the Baltic region in the post-modern era:

The Baltic Assembly aims to promote co-operation between the parliaments of the Baltic states, namely the Republics of Estonia, Latvia and Lithuania. The organisation was planned in Vilnius on 1 December 1990, and the three nations agreed to its structure and rules on 13 June 1994.

The Baltic Free Trade Area (BAFTA) was a trade agreement between Estonia, Lithuania and Latvia. It was signed on 13 September 1993 and came into force on 1 April 1994. The agreement was later extended to apply also to agricultural products, effective from 1 January 1997. BAFTA ceased to exist when its members joined the EU on 1 May 2004.

The Council of the Baltic Sea States (CBSS) was founded in 1992 to promote intergovernmental cooperation among Baltic Sea countries in questions concerning economy, civil society development, human rights issues, and nuclear and radiation safety. It has 12 members including Denmark, Estonia, Finland, Germany, Iceland (since 1995), Latvia, Lithuania, Norway, Poland, Russia, Sweden and the European Commission.

In 2009 the European Council approved the EU Strategy for the Baltic Sea Region (EUSBSR) following a communication from the European Commission. The EUSBSR was the first macro-regional strategy in Europe. The Strategy aims to reinforce cooperation within the Baltic Sea Region, to address challenges together, and to promote balanced development in the Region. The Strategy contributes to major EU policies, including Europe 2020, and reinforces integration within the Region.

Nordic-Baltic Eight

Low Countries region (Benelux)
Since the end of the First World War the following unions have been set in the Low Countries region:

The Benelux is an economic and political union between Belgium, the Netherlands, and Luxembourg. On 5 September 1944, a treaty establishing the Benelux Customs Union was signed. It entered into force in 1948, and ceased to exist on 1 November 1960, when it was replaced by the Benelux Economic Union after a treaty signed in The Hague on 3 February 1958. A Benelux Parliament was created in 1955.

The Belgium-Luxembourg Economic Union (BLEU) can be seen as a forerunner of the Benelux. BLEU was created by the treaty signed on 25 July 1921. It established a single market between both countries, while setting the Belgian franc and Luxembourgian franc at a fixed parity.

Black Sea region
Several regional organisations have been founded in the Black Sea region since the fall of the Soviet Union, such as:

The Organization of the Black Sea Economic Cooperation (BSEC) aims to ensure peace, stability and prosperity by encouraging friendly and good-neighbourly relations among the 12 state members, located mainly in the Black Sea region. It was created on 25 June 1992 in Istanbul, and entered into force on 1 May 1999. The 11 founding members were Albania, Armenia, Azerbaijan, Bulgaria, Georgia, Greece, Moldova, Romania, Russia, Turkey, and Ukraine. Serbia (then Serbia and Montenegro) joined in April 2004.

The GUAM Organization for Democracy and Economic Development is a regional organisation of four post-Soviet states, which aims to promote cooperation and democratic values, ensure stable development, enhance international and regional security, and stepping up European integration. Current members include the four founding ones, namely, Georgia, Ukraine, Azerbaijan, and Moldova. Uzbekistan joined in 1999, and left in 2005.

United Kingdom and Ireland
Since the end of the First World War, the following agreements have been signed in the United Kingdom and Ireland region:

The British–Irish Council was created by the Good Friday Agreement in 1998 to "promote the harmonious and mutually beneficial development of the totality of relationships among the peoples of these islands". It was formally established on 2 December 1999. Its membership comprises Ireland, the United Kingdom, three of the countries of the UK (Northern Ireland, Scotland and Wales), and three British Crown dependencies (Guernsey, the Isle of Man and Jersey). Because England does not have a devolved parliament, it is not represented on the Council as a separate entity.

The Common Travel Area is a passport-free zone established in 1922 that comprises Ireland, the United Kingdom, the Isle of Man, Jersey and Guernsey. Under Irish law, all British citizens are exempt from immigration control and immune from deportation. They are entitled to live in Ireland without any restrictions or conditions. Under British law, Irish citizens are entitled to enter and live in the United Kingdom without any restrictions or conditions. They also have the right to vote, work, study and access welfare and healthcare services. 

In January 2020, the United Kingdom left the EU, reversing most aspects of its 40+ years of participation in EU integration. Ireland continues to remain an enthusiastic member of the Union and participates in some elements of the Schengen Agreement other than the common visa policy [a position likely to remain for as a long as Northern Ireland remains part of the United Kingdom]. The Common Travel Area continues to operate though, other aspects of the relationship are encountering difficulties.

Central Europe

The following cooperation agreements have been signed in Central Europe:

The Visegrád Group is a Central-European alliance for cooperation and European integration, based on an ancient strategic alliance of core Central European countries. The Group originated in a summit meeting of Czechoslovakia, Hungary and Poland held in the Hungarian castle town of Visegrád on 15 February 1991. The Czech Republic and Slovakia became members after the dissolution of Czechoslovakia in 1993.

In 1989, the Central European Initiative, a forum of regional cooperation in Central and Eastern Europe with 18 member states, was formed in Budapest. The CEI headquarters have been in Trieste, Italy, since 1996.

The Central European Free Trade Agreement (CEFTA) is a trade agreement between countries in Central Europe and the Balkans, which works as a preparation for full European Union membership. , it has 7 members: North Macedonia, Albania, Bosnia and Herzegovina, Moldova, Montenegro, Serbia and the UNMIK (as Kosovo).

It was established in 1992 by Czechoslovakia, Hungary and Poland, but came into force only in 1994. Czechoslovakia had in the meantime split into the Czech Republic and Slovakia. Slovenia joined in 1996, while Romania did the same in 1997, Bulgaria in 1999, and Croatia in 2003. In 2004, the Czech Republic, Slovakia, Hungary, Poland, and Slovenia left the CEFTA to join the EU. Romania and Bulgaria left it in 2007 for the same reason. Subsequently, North Macedonia joined it in 2006, and Albania, Bosnia and Herzegovina, Moldova, Montenegro, Serbia and UNMIK (on behalf of Kosovo) in 2007. In 2013, Croatia left the CEFTA to join the EU.

Switzerland and Liechtenstein participate in a customs union since 1924, and both employ the Swiss franc as national currency.

Eastern Europe 
The effects of the EU integration process of the countries from the former Eastern bloc are still debated. As a result, the relationship between immigration levels and EU public support remains uncertain. Through the integration, the countries in Eastern Europe have experienced growth of the economy, benefits of the free market agreements and freedom of the labor movement within the EU. However, the results of the empirical socioeconomic analyses suggest that in Spain, France, Ireland and the Netherlands, the immigration from CEE had negative effects on support for European integration in the host societies. The research also implies that the immigration from the CEE seems to undermine the long-term effects of the integration. There are theories for the programs of social development that range in views from: an extended contact with the immigrants from Eastern Europe might help forge a common European identity and it could also lead to a potential national isolation, caused by tightening support mechanisms for the labor immigration. Equal amount of research also implies that the internal migration of the countries within the EU is necessary for the successful development of its economic union.

Danube region
The EU Strategy for the Danube Region was endorsed by the European Council in 2011 and is the second macro-regional strategy in Europe. The Strategy provides a basis for improved cooperation among 14 countries along the Danube River. It aims to improve the effectiveness of regional integration efforts and leverage the impact of policies at the EU, national and local levels.

Balkans

The Craiova Group, Craiova Four, or C4 is a cooperation project of four European states – Romania, Bulgaria, Greece and Serbia – for the purposes of furthering their European integration as well as economic, transport and energy cooperation with one another.

Council of Europe

Against the background of the devastation and human suffering during the Second World War as well as the need for reconciliation after the war, the idea of European integration led to the creation of the Council of Europe in Strasbourg in 1949.

The most important achievement of the Council of Europe is the European Convention on Human Rights of 1950 with its European Court of Human Rights in Strasbourg, which serves as a de facto supreme court for human rights and fundamental freedoms throughout Europe. Human rights are also protected by the Council of Europe's Committee for the Prevention of Torture and the European Social Charter.

Most conventions of the Council of Europe pursue the aim of greater legal integration, such as the conventions on legal assistance, against corruption, against money laundering, against doping in sport, or internet crime.

Cultural co-operation is based on the Cultural Convention of 1954 and subsequent conventions on the recognition of university studies and diplomas as well as on the protection of minority languages.

After the fall of the Berlin Wall, former communist European countries were able to accede to the Council of Europe, which now comprises 46 states in Europe. Therefore, European integration has practically succeeded at the level of the Council of Europe, encompassing almost the whole European continent, with the exception of Belarus, Kazakhstan, Kosovo, Russia, and the Vatican City.

European integration at the level of the Council of Europe functions through the accession of member states to its conventions, and through political coordination at the level of ministerial conferences and inter-parliamentary sessions. In accordance with its Statute of 1949, the Council of Europe works to achieve greater unity among its members based on common values, such as human rights and democracy.

European Political Community

The European Political Community (EPC) is an intergovernmental forum for political and strategic discussions about the future of Europe. The inaugural summit was held on 6 October 2022 in Prague, with participants from 44 European countries, as well as the Presidents of the European Council and the European Commission.

Organization for Security and Co-operation in Europe
The Organization for Security and Co-operation in Europe (OSCE) is a trans-Atlantic intergovernmental organisation whose aim is to secure stability in Europe. It was established as the Conference on Security and Co-operation in Europe (CSCE) in July 1973, and was subsequently transformed into its current form in January 1995. The OSCE has 56 member states, covering most of the northern hemisphere.

The OSCE develops three lines of activities, namely the Politico-Military Dimension, the Economic and Environmental Dimension and the Human Dimension. These respectively promote (i) mechanisms for conflict prevention and resolution; (ii) the monitoring, alerting and assistance in case of economic and environmental threats; and (iii) full respect for human rights and fundamental freedoms.

European Free Trade Association

The European Free Trade Association (EFTA) is a European trade bloc which was established on 3 May 1960 as an alternative for European states who did not join the EEC. EFTA currently has four member states: Iceland, Norway, Switzerland, and Liechtenstein; just Norway and Switzerland are founding members.

The EFTA Convention was signed on 4 January 1960 in Stockholm by seven states: Austria, Denmark, Norway, Portugal, Sweden, Switzerland and the United Kingdom. Finland became an associate member in 1961 and a full member in 1986; Iceland joined in 1970 and Liechtenstein did the same in 1991. A revised Convention, the Vaduz Convention, was signed on 21 June 2001 and entered into force on 1 June 2002.

The United Kingdom and Denmark left in 1973, when they joined the European Community (EC). Portugal left EFTA in 1986, when it also joined the EC. Austria, Finland and Sweden ceased to be EFTA members in 1995 by joining the European Union, which superseded the EC in 1993.

European Broadcasting Union

The European Broadcasting Union (EBU) is an alliance of public service media entities, established on 12 February 1950. , the organisation comprises 73 active members in 56 countries, and 34 associate members from a further 20 countries. Most EU states are part of this organisation and therefore EBU has been subject to supranational legislation and regulation. It also hosted debates between candidates for the European Commission presidency for the 2014 parliamentary elections but is unrelated to the institution itself.

European Patent Convention

The European Patent Convention (EPC), also known as the Convention on the Grant of European Patents of 5 October 1973, is a multilateral treaty instituting the European Patent Organisation and providing an autonomous legal system according to which European patents are granted. As of 2013, there are 38 parties to the European Patent Convention. The Convention on the Grant of European Patents was first signed on 5 October 1973.

European Communities
In 1951, Belgium, France, Italy, Luxembourg, the Netherlands and West Germany agreed to confer powers over their steel and coal production to the European Coal and Steel Community (ECSC) in the Treaty of Paris, which came into force on 23 July 1952.

Coal and steel production was essential for the reconstruction of countries in Europe after the Second World War and this sector of the national economy had been important for warfare in the First and Second World Wars. Therefore, France had originally maintained its occupation of the Saarland with its steel companies after the founding of the Federal Republic of Germany (West Germany) in 1949. By transferring national powers over the coal and steel production to a newly created ECSC Commission, the member states of the ECSC were able to provide for greater transparency and trust among themselves.

This transfer of national powers to a "Community" to be exercised by its Commission was paralleled under the 1957 Treaty of Rome establishing the European Atomic Energy Community (or Euratom) and the European Economic Community (EEC) in Brussels.

In 1967, the Merger Treaty (or Brussels Treaty) combine the institutions of the ECSC and Euratom into that of the EEC. They already shared a Parliamentary Assembly and Courts. Collectively they were known as the European Communities. In 1987, the Single European Act (SEA) was the first major revision of the Treaty of Rome that formally established the single European market and the European Political Cooperation. The Communities originally had independent personalities although they were increasingly integrated, and over the years were transformed into what is now called the European Union.

The six states that founded the three Communities were known as the "inner six" (the "outer seven" were those countries who formed the European Free Trade Association). These were Belgium, France, Italy, Luxembourg, the Netherlands, and West Germany. The first enlargement was in 1973, with the accession of Denmark, Ireland and the United Kingdom. Greece joined in 1981, and Portugal and Spain in 1986. On 3 October 1990 East Germany and West Germany were reunified, hence East Germany became part of the Community in the new reunified Germany (not increasing the number of states).

A key person in the Community creation process was Jean Monnet, regarded as the "founding father" of the European Union, which is seen as the dominant force in European integration.

European Union

The European Union (EU) is an association of 27 sovereign member states, that by treaty have delegated certain of their competences to common institutions, in order to coordinate their policies in a number of areas, without however constituting a new state on top of the member states. Officially established by the Treaty of Maastricht in 1993 upon the foundations of the pre-existing European Economic Community.

Thus, 12 states are founding members, namely, Belgium, Denmark, France, Germany, Greece,  Ireland, Italy, Luxembourg, the Netherlands, Portugal, Spain, and the United Kingdom. In 1995, Austria, Finland and Sweden entered the EU. Cyprus, the Czech Republic, Estonia, Hungary, Latvia, Lithuania, Malta, Poland, Slovakia, and Slovenia joined in 2004. Bulgaria and Romania joined in 2007. Croatia acceded in 2013. The United Kingdom withdrew in 2020 after 47 years of membership. Official candidate states include Albania, North Macedonia, Montenegro, Serbia and Turkey. Morocco's application was rejected by the EEC. Iceland and Switzerland have withdrawn their respective applications. Norway rejected membership in two referendums.

The institutions of the European Union, its parliamentarians, judges, commissioners and secretariat, the governments of its member states as well as their people, all play a role in European Integration. Nevertheless, the question of who plays the key role is disputed as there are different theories on European Integration focusing on different actors and agency.

The European Union has a number of relationships with nations that are not formally part of the Union. According to the European Union's official site, and a statement by Commissioner Günter Verheugen, the aim is to have a ring of countries, sharing EU's democratic ideals and joining them in further integration without necessarily becoming full member states.

Competences

Whilst most responsibilities ('competences') are retained by the member states, some competences are conferred exclusively on the Union for collective decision, some are shared pending Union action and some receive Union support.  These are shown on this table:

Economic integration

The European Union operates a single economic market across the territory of all its members, and uses a single currency between the Eurozone members. Further, the EU has a number of economic relationships with nations that are not formally part of the Union through the European Economic Area and customs union agreements.

Free trade area

The creation of the EEC eliminated tariffs, quotas and preferences on goods among member states, which are the requisites to define a free trade area (FTA). The United Kingdom remains part of the FTA during the transition period of the Brexit withdrawal agreement.

Numerous countries have signed a European Union Association Agreement (AA) with FTA provisions. These mainly include Mediterranean countries (Algeria in 2005, Egypt in 2004, Israel in 2000, Jordan in 2002, Lebanon in 2006, Morocco in 2000, Palestinian National Authority in 1997, and Tunisia in 1998), albeit some countries from other trade blocs have also signed one (such as Chile in 2003, Mexico in 2000, and South Africa in 2000).

Further, many Balkan states have signed a Stabilisation and Association Agreement (SAA) with FTA provisions, such as Albania (signed 2006), Montenegro (2007), North Macedonia (2004), Bosnia and Herzegovina and Serbia (both 2008, entry-into-force pending).

In 2008, Poland and Sweden proposed the Eastern Partnership which would include setting a FTA between the EU and Armenia, Azerbaijan, Belarus, Georgia, Moldova and Ukraine.

Customs union
The European Union Customs Union defines an area where no customs are levied on goods travelling within it. It includes all member states of the European Union. The abolition of internal tariff barriers between EEC member states was achieved in 1968.

Andorra and San Marino belong to the EU customs unions with third states. Turkey is linked by the European Union-Turkey Customs Union.

European Single Market

A prominent goal of the EU since its creation by the Maastricht Treaty in 1992 is establishing and maintaining a single market. This seeks to guarantee the four basic freedoms, which are related to ensure the free movement of goods, services, capital and people around the EU's internal market.

The United Kingdom remained part of the single market during the transition period of the Brexit withdrawal agreement. The European Economic Area (EEA) agreement allows Norway, Iceland and Liechtenstein to participate in the European Single Market without joining the EU. The four basic freedoms apply. However, some restrictions on fisheries and agriculture take place. Switzerland is linked to the European Union by Swiss-EU bilateral agreements, with a different content from that of the EEA agreement.

Eurozone

The Eurozone refers to the European Union member states that have adopted the euro currency union as the third stage of the European Economic and Monetary Union (EMU). Further, certain states outside the EU have adopted the euro as their currency, despite not belonging to the EMU. Thus, a total of 26 states, including 20 European Union states and six non-EU members, currently use the euro.

The Eurozone came into existence with the official launch of the euro on 1 January 1999. Physical coins and banknotes were introduced on 1 January 2002.

The original members were Austria, Belgium, Finland, France, Germany, Ireland, Italy, Luxembourg, the Netherlands, Portugal, and Spain. Greece adopted the euro on 1 January 2001. Slovenia joined on 1 January 2007, Cyprus and Malta were admitted on 1 January 2008, Slovakia joined on 1 January 2009, Estonia on 1 January 2011, Latvia on 1 January 2014, Lithuania on 1 January 2015 and Croatia on 1 January 2023.

Outside the EU, agreements have been concluded with Andorra, Monaco, San Marino, and Vatican City for formal adoption, including the right to issue their own coins. Montenegro and Kosovo unilaterally adopted the euro when it launched.

Fiscal union

There has long been speculation about the possibility of the European Union eventually becoming a fiscal union. In the wake of the European debt crisis that began in 2009, calls for closer fiscal ties, possibly leading to some sort of fiscal union have increased; though it is generally regarded as implausible in the short term, some analysts regard fiscal union as a long-term necessity. While stressing the need for coordination, governments have rejected talk of fiscal union or harmonisation in this regard.

Aviation

There are three main aviation related institutions present in Europe:
 European Civil Aviation Conference (ECAC)
 Eurocontrol
 European Common Aviation Area (ECAA)

Energy

The transnational energy related structures present in Europe are:
 Energy Community
 European Atomic Energy Community
 European Network of Transmission System Operators for Electricity
 European Network of Transmission System Operators for Gas
 INOGATE
 Energy Charter Treaty

Standardisation
The transnational standardisation organisations present in Europe are:

 European Telecommunications Standards Institute (ETSI)
 European Committee for Standardization (CEN)
 European Committee for Electrotechnical Standardization (CENELEC)
 Institute for Reference Materials and Measurements (IRMM)

Social and political integration

Education
The ERASMUS programme (European Region Action Scheme for the Mobility of University Students) seeks to encourage and support free movement of the academic community. It was established in 1987.

A total of 33 states (including all European Union states, Iceland, Liechtenstein, Norway, Switzerland and Turkey) are involved.

The European Higher Education Area (EHEA) aims to integrate education systems in Europe. Thus, degrees and study periods are recognised mutually. This is done by following the Bologna process, and under the Lisbon Recognition Convention of the Council of Europe.

The Bologna declaration was signed in 1999 by 29 countries, all EU members or candidates at the moment (except Cyprus which joined later) and three out of four EFTA countries: Austria, Belgium, Bulgaria, Czech Republic, Denmark, Estonia, Finland, France, Germany, Greece, Hungary, Iceland, Ireland, Italy, Latvia, Lithuania, Luxembourg, Malta, the Netherlands, Norway, Poland, Portugal, Romania, Slovakia, Slovenia, Spain, Sweden, Switzerland, and United Kingdom. Croatia, Cyprus, Liechtenstein, and Turkey joined in 2001. In 2003, Albania, Andorra, Bosnia and Herzegovina, the Holy See (a Council of Europe permanent observer), North Macedonia, Russia, and Serbia signed the convention. Armenia, Azerbaijan, Georgia, Moldova and Ukraine followed in 2005. Montenegro joined in 2007. Finally, Kazakhstan (not a member of the Council of Europe) joined in 2010. This makes a total of 47 member states. Monaco and San Marino are the only members of the Council of Europe which have not adopted the convention. The other European nation that is eligible to join, but has not, is Belarus.

Research
There are a number of multinational research institutions based in Europe. 

In the EIROforum collaboration:
 European Space Agency 
 European Molecular Biology Laboratory 
 European Fusion Development Agreement 
 European Southern Observatory 
 Particle physics:
 CERN
 European Synchrotron Radiation Facility
 Institut Laue–Langevin
 European XFEL
Meteorology:
 EUMETSAT
 European Centre for Medium-Range Weather Forecasts
 EUMETNET

Health

The European Health Insurance Card (or EHIC) is issued free of charge and allows anyone who is insured by or covered by a statutory social security scheme of the EEA countries and Switzerland to receive medical treatment in another member state for free or at a reduced cost, if that treatment becomes necessary during their visit (for example, due to illness or an accident), or if they have a chronic pre-existing condition which requires care such as kidney dialysis.

The epSOS project, also known as Smart Open Services for European Patients, aims to promote free movement of patients. It will allow health professionals to electronically access the data from patients from another country, to electronically process prescriptions in all involved countries, or to provide treatment in another EU state to a patient on a waiting list.

The project has been launched by the EU and 47 member institutions from 23 EU member states and 3 non-EU members. They include national health ministries, national competence centres, social insurance institutions and scientific institutions as well as technical and administrative management entities.

Charter of Fundamental Rights
The Charter of Fundamental Rights of the European Union is a document enshrining certain fundamental rights. The wording of the document has been agreed at ministerial level and has been incorporated into the Treaty of Lisbon. Poland has negotiated an opt out from this Charter, as had the United Kingdom before the latter's withdrawal from the European Union.

Right to vote
The European integration process has extended the right of foreigners to vote. Thus, European Union citizens were given voting rights in local elections by the 1992 Maastricht Treaty. Several member states (Belgium, Luxembourg, Lithuania, and Slovenia) have extended since then the right to vote to all foreign residents. This was already the case in Denmark, Finland, the Netherlands and Sweden. Further, voting and eligibility rights are granted among citizens of the Nordic Passport Union, and between numerous countries through bilateral treaties (i.e. between Norway and Spain, or between Portugal and Brazil, Cape Verde, Iceland, Norway, Uruguay, Venezuela, Chile and Argentina), or without them (i.e. Ireland and the United Kingdom). Finally, within the EEA, Iceland and Norway also grant the right to vote to all foreign residents.

Schengen zone

The main purpose of the establishment of the Schengen Agreement is the abolition of physical borders among European countries. A total of 30 states, including 26 European Union states (all except Ireland, which is part of the Common travel area with the United Kingdom) and four non-EU members (Iceland, Liechtenstein, Norway, and Switzerland), are subject to the Schengen rules. Its provisions have already been implemented by 27 states, leaving just Bulgaria, Cyprus, and Romania to do so among signatory states.

Further, Monaco, San Marino and Vatican City are de facto members.

Visa policy in EU

European Union has visa-free regime agreements with some European countries outside EU and discussing such agreements with others; Armenia, Russia, Ukraine, and Moldova. Matters concerning Turkey have also been debated. Ireland  maintains an independent visa policy in the EU.

Defence

There are a number of multi-national military and peacekeeping forces which are ultimately under the command of the EU, and therefore can be seen as the core for a future European Union army. These corps include forces from 26 EU states – all except Denmark, which had an opt-out clause in its accession treaty and was not obliged to participate in the common defence policy, but in 2022 decided to abandon its stance; and Malta, which currently does not participate in any battlegroup –, Norway and Turkey. Further, the Western European Union (WEU) capabilities and functions have been transferred to the European Union, under its developing Common Foreign and Security Policy (CFSP) and European Security and Defence Policy (ESDP).

The EU also has close ties with the North Atlantic Treaty Organization (NATO), according to the Berlin Plus agreement. This is a comprehensive package of agreements made between NATO and the EU on 16 December 2002. With this agreement the EU is given the possibility to use NATO assets in case it wanted to act independently in an international crisis, on the condition that NATO does not want to act itself – the so-called "right of first refusal".

In fact, many EU member states are among the 28 NATO members. The Treaty of Brussels is considered the precursor to NATO. The North Atlantic Treaty was signed in Washington, D.C., in 1949. It included the five Treaty of Brussels states, as well as the United States, Canada, Portugal, Italy, Norway, Denmark and Iceland. Greece and Turkey joined the alliance in 1952, and West Germany did the same in 1955. Spain entered in 1982. In 1999, Hungary, the Czech Republic, and Poland became NATO members. Finally, Bulgaria, Estonia, Latvia, Lithuania, Romania, Slovenia, and Slovakia joined in 2004. In 2009, Croatia and Albania joined. In 2008, Ukraine and Georgia were told that they will also eventually become members. Thus, 21 out of 28 NATO states are among the 27 EU members, another two are members of the EEA, and one more is an EU candidate and also a member of the European Union Customs Union.

Space

On 22 May 2007, the member states of the European Union have agreed to create a common political framework for space activities in Europe by unifying the approach of the European Space Agency (ESA) with those of the individual European Union member states.

However, ESA is an intergovernmental organisation with no formal organic link to the EU; indeed the two institutions have different member states and are governed by different rules and procedures. ESA was created in 1975 by the merger of the two pre-existing European organisations engaged in space activities, ELDO and ESRO. The 10 founding members were Belgium, Denmark, France, Germany, Italy, the Netherlands, Spain, Sweden, Switzerland and the United Kingdom. Ireland joined on 31 December 1975. In 1987, Austria and Norway became member states. Finland joined in 1995, Portugal in 2000, Greece and Luxembourg in 2005, the Czech Republic in 2008, and Romania in 2011. Currently, it has 20 member states: all the EU member states before 2004, plus Czech Republic, Norway, Poland, Romania, and Switzerland. In addition, Canada has had the special status of a Cooperating State under a series of cooperation agreements dating since 1979.

In 2007 the political perspective of the European Union was to make ESA an agency of the EU by 2014. ESA is likely to expand in the coming years with the countries which joined the EU in both 2004 and 2007. Currently, almost all EU member states are in different stages of affiliation with ESA. Poland has joined on 19 November 2012. Hungary and Estonia have signed ESA Convention. Latvia and Slovenia have started to implement a Plan for European Cooperating State (PECS) Charter. Slovakia, Lithuania and Bulgaria have signed a European Cooperating State (ECS) Agreement. Cyprus, Malta and Croatia have signed Cooperation Agreements with ESA.

Membership in European Union agreements

A small group of EU member states have joined all European treaties, instead of opting out on some. They drive the development of a federal model for the European integration. This is linked to the concept of Multi-speed Europe where some countries would create a core union; and goes back to the Inner Six references to the founding member states of the European Communities.

At present, the formation of a formal Core Europe Federation ("a federation within the confederation") has been held off at every occasion where such a federation treaty had been discussed. Instead, supranational institutions are created that govern more areas in "Inner Europe" than existing European integration provides for.

Among the 27 EU state members, eighteen states have signed all integration agreements: Austria, Belgium, Croatia, Finland, Estonia, France, Germany, Greece, Italy, Latvia, Lithuania, Luxembourg, Malta, Netherlands, Portugal, Slovakia, Slovenia and Spain. The agreements considered include the fifth stage of economic integration or EMU, the Schengen agreement, and the Area of freedom, security and justice (AFSJ).

Thus, among the 27 EU countries, 20 have joined the Eurozone, and 23 have joined Schengen, and 24 have no opt-outs under AFSJ.

Further, some countries which do not belong to the EU have joined several of these initiatives, albeit sometimes at a lower stage such as the Customs Union, the Common Market (EEA), or even unilaterally adopting the euro, and by taking part in Schengen, either as a signatory state, or de facto.

Thus, six non-EU countries have adopted the euro (four through an agreement with the EU and two unilaterally), and four non-EU states have joined the Schengen agreement officially.

The following table shows the status of each state membership to the different agreements promoted by the EU. It lists 47 countries, including the 27 EU member states, 7 candidate states, 3 members of the EEA and Switzerland, 3 countries with soft ties to the EU (such as those with SAA or participation agreements), 4 microstates, and the United Kingdom and Armenia as special cases.

Hence, this table summarises some components of EU laws applied in most European states. Some territories of EU member states also have a special status in regard to EU laws applied. Some territories of EFTA member states also have a special status in regard to EU laws applied as is the case with some European microstates. For member states that do not have special-status territories the EU law applies fully with the exception of the opt-outs in the European Union and states under a safeguard clause or alternatively some states participate in enhanced co-operation between a subset of the EU members. Additionally, there are various examples of non-participation by some EU members and non-EU states participation in particular Agencies of the European Union, the programmes for European Higher Education Area, European Research Area and Erasmus Mundus.

Notes:

Future of European integration

There is no fixed end to the process of integration. The discussion on the possible final political shape or configuration of the European Union is sometimes referred to as the debate on the finalité politique (French for "political purpose"). Integration and enlargement of the European Union are major issues in the politics of Europe, each at European, national and local level. Integration may conflict with national sovereignty and cultural identity, and is opposed by eurosceptics. To the east of the European Union, the countries of Belarus, Kazakhstan and Russia launched the creation of the Eurasian Union in the year 2015, which was subsequently joined by Armenia and Kyrgyzstan. Other states in the region, such as Moldova and Tajikistan may also join. Meanwhile, the post-Soviet disputed states of Abkhazia, Artsakh, South Ossetia, and Transnistria have created the Community for Democracy and Rights of Nations to closer integrate among each other. Some Eastern European countries such as Armenia have opted to cooperate with both the EU and the Eurasian Union. On 24 February 2017 Tigran Sargsyan, the Chairman of the Eurasian Economic Commission stated that Armenia's stance was to cooperate and work with both the European Union and the Eurasian Union. Sargsyan added that although Armenia is part of the Eurasian Union, a new European Union Association Agreement between Armenia and the EU would be finalized shortly.

Several countries in Eastern Europe have engaged the EU with the aim to grow economic and political ties. The Euronest Parliamentary Assembly, established in 2003, is the inter-parliamentary forum in which members of the European Parliament and the national parliaments of Ukraine, Moldova, Belarus, Armenia, Azerbaijan and Georgia participate and forge closer political and economic ties with the European Union. All of these States participate in the EU's Eastern Partnership program. The Organization of the Black Sea Economic Cooperation and the Community of Democratic Choice are other organizations established to promote European integration, stability, and democracy. On 12 January 2002, the European Parliament noted that Armenia and Georgia may enter the EU in the future. Currently, Georgia is the only country in the Caucasus actively seeking EU membership.

European Security Treaty
In 2008, Russian President Dmitry Medvedev announced a new concept for Russian foreign politics and called for the creation of a common space in Euro-Atlantic and Eurasia area "from Vancouver to Vladivostok". On 5 June 2009 in Berlin he proposed a new all-European pact for security that would include all European, CIS countries and the United States. On 29 November 2009 a draft version of the European Security Treaty appeared. French president Sarkozy spoke positively about Medvedev's ideas and called for closer security and economic relation between Europe and Russia.

Common space from Lisbon to Vladivostok

Russian Prime Minister Vladimir Putin in a German newspaper in 2010 called for common economic space, free-trade area or more advanced economic integration, stretching from Lisbon to Vladivostok. He also said it is quite possible Russia could join the eurozone one day. French president Nicolas Sarkozy in 2010 said he believes in 10 or 15 years there will be common economic space between EU and Russia with visa-free regime and general concept of security.

Russian economic policy is self-sufficiency and economic security. Russia is unable to compete with the EU economy, so integration might be at the cost of its own political and socio-economic stability.

Concept of a single legal space for the CIS and Europe

Russian legal scholar Oleg Kutafin and economist Alexander Zakharov produced a Concept of a Single Legal Space for the CIS and Europe in 2002. This idea was fully incorporated in the resolution of the 2003 Moscow Legal Forum. The Forum gathered representatives of more than 20 countries including 10 CIS countries. In 2007 both the International Union of Jurists of the CIS and the International Union (Commonwealth) of Advocates passed resolutions that strongly support the Concept of a Single Legal Space for Europe and post-Soviet Countries.

The concept said: "Obviously, to improve its legislation Russia and other countries of CIS should be oriented toward the continental legal family of European law. The civil law system is much closer to the Russian and other CIS countries will be instrumental in harmonising legislation of CIS countries and the European Community but all values of common law should be also investigated on the subject of possible implementation in some laws and norms.
It is suggested that the introduction of the concept of a Single legal space and a single Rule of Law space for Europe and CIS be implemented in four steps:
 Development plans at the national level regarding adoption of selected EC legal standards in the legislation of CIS countries;
 Promotion of measures for harmonisation of law with the goal of developing a single legal space for Europe and CIS countries in the area of commercial and corporate law;
 Making the harmonisation of judicial practice of CIS countries compatible with Rule of Law principles and coordination of the basic requirements of the Rule of Law in CIS countries with the EU legal standards.
 Development of ideas the Roerich Pact (International Treaty on the Protection of Artistic and Scientific Institution and Historic Monuments initiated by Russian thinker Nicholas Roerich and signed in 1935 by 40 % of sovereign states in Washington D.C.) into the law of CIS countries and European law.

Beyond Europe

Euro-Mediterranean Partnership

The Euro-Mediterranean Partnership or Barcelona Process was organised by the European Union to strengthen its relations with the countries in the Mashriq and Maghreb regions. It started in 1995 with the Barcelona Euro-Mediterranean Conference, and it has been developed in successive annual meetings.

The European Union enlargement of 2004 brought two more Mediterranean countries (Cyprus and Malta) into the Union, while adding a total of 10 to the number of Member States. The Euro-Mediterranean Partnership today comprises 43 members: 27 European Union member states, and 15 partner countries (Albania, Algeria, Bosnia and Herzegovina, Egypt, Israel, Jordan, Lebanon, Libya, Mauritania, Monaco, Montenegro, Morocco, Syria and Tunisia, as well as the Palestinian Territories). Libya has had observer status since 1999.

The Euro-Mediterranean Free Trade Area (EU-MEFTA) is based on the Barcelona Process and European Neighbourhood Policy (ENP). It will cover the EU, the EFTA, the EU customs unions with third states (Andorra, San Marino, and Turkey), the EU candidate states, and the partners of the Barcelona Process.

The Union for the Mediterranean is a community of countries, mostly bordering the Mediterranean Sea, established in July 2008.

Ties with partners
Morocco already has a number of close ties with the EU, including an Association Agreement with FTA provisions, air transport integration, or the participation in military operations such as ALTHEA in Bosnia.

Further, it will be the first partner to go beyond association by enhancing political and economic ties, entering the Single Market, and participating in some EU agencies.

Commonwealth of Independent States

The Commonwealth of Independent States (CIS) is a loose organisation in which most former Soviet republics participate. A visa-free regime operates among members and a free-trade area is planned. Ukraine is not an official member, but has participated in the organisation. Some members are more integrated than others, for example Russia and Belarus form a Union State. In 2010, Belarus, Russia and Kazakhstan formed a customs union and a single market (Common Economic Space) commenced on 1 January 2012. The Presidents of Belarus, Russia and Kazakhstan established the Eurasian Union with a Eurasian Commission in 2015, subsequently joined by Armenia and Kyrgyzstan. A common currency is also planned, potentially to be named "evraz". Some other countries in the region, such as Moldova are potential members of these organisations.

Community for Democracy and Rights of Nations
The post-Soviet disputed states of Abkhazia, Artsakh, South Ossetia, and Transnistria are all members of the Community for Democracy and Rights of Nations which aims to forge closer integration.

EU and other regions and countries in the world

The European Union cooperates with some other countries and regions via loose organisations and regular meetings. The ASEM forum, consisting of the EU and some Asian countries, has been held every two years since 1996. The EU and African, Caribbean and Pacific Group of States form the ACP–EU Joint Parliamentary Assembly, promoting ACP–EU development cooperation, democracy and human rights. The EU and Latin American countries form the Euro-Latin American Parliamentary Assembly. TAFTA is a proposed free-trade area between EU and United States.

 ASEM – Asia–Europe Meeting
 ACP – African, Caribbean and Pacific Group of States (Economic Partnership Agreements)
 EuroLat – Euro-Latin American Parliamentary Assembly
 TAFTA – Transatlantic Free Trade Area

Other organisations in world
European countries like the United Kingdom, France, Spain, Portugal have made organisations with other countries in the world with which they have strong cultural and historical links.

European languages in the world
English is considered to be the global lingua franca. European languages like English, French, Spanish, Portuguese, Italian, Russian and German are official, co-official or widely in use in many countries with a colonial past or with a European diaspora.

World integration

See also
Assembly of European Regions
Organization of the Black Sea Economic Cooperation
Common Foreign and Security Policy
CIS
Community for Democracy and Rights of Nations
Community of Democratic Choice
Council of Europe
Eastern Partnership
Enlargement of the European Union
Eurasian Economic Union
Euronest Parliamentary Assembly
European Coal and Steel Community
European Policy Centre
European values
Europe Day
Euroscepticism
Eurosphere
Eurovoc
Federal Europe
Federalism
Intergovernmentalism
International organisations in Europe
Mechanism for Cooperation and Verification
Multi-level governance
Multi-speed Europe
Neofunctionalism
North American integration 
Pan-European identity
Politics of Europe
Pro-European
Pulse of Europe Initiative
Regions of Europe
Roman Empire
Supranationalism
TRACECA
United States of Europe
Virtual Centre for Knowledge on Europe

Notes

References

Further reading
 Carrasco, C. A., & Peinado, P. (2014). On the origin of European imbalances in the context of European integration, Working papers wpaper71, Financialisation, Economy, Society & Sustainable Development (FESSUD) Project.
 Glencross, A. (2014). The Politics of European Integration: Political Union or a House Divided.

 
Council of Europe
Pan-Europeanism
Regionalism (international relations)